Kückelheim is a locality in the municipality Schmallenberg in the district Hochsauerlandkreis in North Rhine-Westphalia, Germany.

The village has 83 inhabitants and lies in the west of the municipality of Schmallenberg at a height of around 390 m. Kückelheim borders on the villages of Arpe, Bracht, Selkentrop and Werntrop.

References

Villages in North Rhine-Westphalia
Schmallenberg